Wilbron A. Clay Jr. (March 28, 1894 – August 18, 1967), nicknamed "Buddy", was an American Negro league second baseman in the 1920s.

A native of Pittsburgh, Pennsylvania, Clay played for the Pittsburgh Keystones in 1921. He died in Los Angeles, California in 1967 at age 73.

References

External links
 and Seamheads

1894 births
1967 deaths
Pittsburgh Keystones players
20th-century African-American sportspeople